The Shockoe Bottom African Burial Ground, or (African Burial Ground in Shockoe Bottom) known historically as the "Burial Ground for Negroes", is the older of two municipal burial grounds established for the interment of free people of color and the enslaved in the city of Richmond, Virginia. It is located at 1554 E Broad St. (alternate address 1520 E Marshall St.), across from the site of Lumpkin's Jail, in Shockoe Bottom. The area now known as Shockoe Bottom, was historically known as Shockoe Valley. Richmond's second African Burial Ground, called the "Shockoe Hill African Burying Ground" is the larger of the two burial grounds, and is located a mile and a half away at 1305 N 5th St, on Shockoe Hill.

History

The Shockoe Bottom African Burial Ground was thought to have been established as early as 1750, however a land deed for the property supports a 1799 founding. It was closed to new burials in 1816 upon the opening of the Shockoe Hill African Burying Ground (Richmond's 2nd African Burial Ground) located at 1305 N 5th St.

In 1799 the city of Richmond purchased two parcels of land on which it would establish its municipal burying grounds. A 28 1/2 acre parcel was acquired on the northern end of Shockoe Hill, and a much smaller parcel in Shockoe Valley. The Parcel on Shockoe Hill was purchased for the purpose of becoming the white burying ground (along with other purposes). The parcel in Shockoe Valley was intended for Black burials. The Burial Ground for Negroes, the name by which the Shockoe Bottom African Burial Ground appeared on the 1809 Plan of the City of Richmond by Richard Young, became also the site of  city gallows after 1804. The 1809 Plan shows it to be the location of the powder magazine as well. In recent times, the African Burial Ground was thought to be where Gabriel, the leader of a famous slave rebellion, known as Gabriel's Rebellion, or Gabriel's Conspiracy, and 25 of his followers were executed and buried in 1800. Though further research suggests that the execution of Gabriel, and also the execution of his followers, may have occurred in a different location. The actual sites of burial are unknown.

The parcel on which the Burial Ground for Negroes was established, was on or close to the banks of the Shockoe Creek. It's location was poorly suited for a burial ground. Each hard rain caused disruption, washing bodies into the creek. Christopher McPherson, a formerly enslaved free person of color, described the appalling conditions of the burial ground in his 1810 book "A Short History of the Life of Christopher McPherson, Alias Pherson, Son of Christ, King of Kings and Lord of Lords. Containing a Collection of Certificates, Letters, &c. Written by Himself." The book was republished in 1855. McPherson, wrote and circulated the petition that was submitted to the Richmond City Council requesting a new burial ground for the free people of color in the city of Richmond. The petition eventually led to the establishment of what was referred to on the city of Richmond's 1816 Plan of its property located at the Poorhouse, as the Burying Ground for Free People of Colour, and the Burying Ground for Negroes - (enslaved) - now called the "Shockoe Hill African Burying Ground". The original two one acre burying ground parcels were located within the 28 1/2 acre property purchased by the city in 1799. Upon the opening of these two new burying grounds on Shockoe Hill, the Shockoe Bottom African Burial Ground (old Burial Ground for Negroes) was closed to new burials, and the site immediately repurposed by the city. First constructed on the site was the Lancastrian School in 1816, and later the city jail was also constructed there. The burial ground was made to completely disappear from the landscape and also from memory. That was until a local historian rediscovered it on a map in the 1990s. At that time the burial ground had become a parking lot, which was purchased by Virginia Commonwealth University (VCU) in about 2004. Activists quickly organized and actively became involved in the struggle for the reclamation of the burial ground. An important group formed from and for this struggle was the Sacred Ground Historical Reclamation Project, of the Defenders for Freedom, Justice and Equality. They continue to be active advocates and stewards of the Shockoe Bottom African Burial Ground.

Commemoration

The Sacred Ground Historical Reclamation Project, of the  Defenders for Freedom, Justice & Equality, hosts each October, a community gathering at the Shockoe Bottom African Burial Ground. The Annual Gabriel Gathering honors Gabriel the leader of the great slave rebellion, and all those who gave their lives in the cause of freedom. It is also a celebration of the more than 20 years of learning the history of this sacred ground. The event also serves as a re-dedication to reclamation and the proper memorization of the area of Shockoe Bottom, which was once the epicenter of the U.S. domestic slave trade.

References

External links
Meet Me In The Bottom: The Struggle to Reclaim Richmond's African Burial Ground
 Workers World: Virginia Commonwealth U. acknowledges African burial ground
Sacred Ground Historical Reclamation Project: Richmond African Burial Ground
Richmond Cemeteries: African Burial Ground
Death and Rebirth in a Southern City, Richmond's Historic Cemeteries, by Ryan K. Smith, 2020
 Urban Scale Richmond, The Location of Richmond’s first African-American Burial Ground
Slave Burial Ground Protest, CBS6 News
 Black Agenda Report, Commemorating Gabriel's Rebellion at the African Burial Ground in Richmond, Virginia 
 The Virginia Defender, 20TH ANNUAL GABRIEL GATHERING SET FOR OCTOBER 10 AT SHOCKOE BOTTOM AFRICAN BURIAL GROUND
The Collegian, Community gathers for 20th Annual Gabriel Gathering at Shockoe Bottom African Burial Ground
 Radio IQ, Richmond couple reflects on 20 years leading the fight to memorialize Shockoe Bottom

Cemeteries in Richmond, Virginia
African-American cemeteries in Virginia
African-American history in Richmond, Virginia
History of slavery in Virginia
African-American historic places